Austin Harris Mahone (born April 4, 1996) is an American singer and songwriter. Mahone gained popularity performing covers of pop songs on YouTube. 

Mahone has released one studio album, 2017's Dirty Work – The Album, three EPs and two mixtapes, This Is Not the Album (2015) and ForMe+You (2016). He is best known for the singles "Say Somethin", "Say You're Just a Friend" featuring Flo Rida, "What About Love", "Mmm Yeah" with Pitbull and "Why Don't We". As of 2023, Mahone releases music as an independent artist.

Early life
Austin Harris Mahone was born in San Antonio, Texas, the son of Michele Lee (née Demyanovich) and Charles Edgar Mahone. His father died when he was a year and a half old, and he was raised as a Catholic by his single mother. Mahone is of English, French, German, and Slovak descent. He attended Lady Bird Johnson High School in San Antonio but left after his freshman year and was homeschooled at his grandmother's house.

Career

2010–2014: Extended Play and The Secret
Mahone began his career by posting videos on YouTube in June 2010. More music videos followed, and by January 2011 he began to build an online following. In October 2011, Mahone posted a video covering Justin Bieber's "Mistletoe". Mahone has cited Bieber as his inspiration.

On February 14, 2012, Mahone independently released his first single, "11:11", to iTunes. On June 5, 2012, he released his second single worldwide, "Say Somethin". On August 28, 2012, Mahone announced that he had been officially signed to Chase/Republic Records. In November 2012, Mahone signed a deal to become the new "Teen Ambassador" for Lil Wayne's Trukfit fashion clothing line.
He has filmed commercials for McDonald's and Hot Nuts, a Mexican snack. On December 3, 2012, Mahone released a song titled "Say You're Just a Friend" featuring rapper Flo Rida as a digital download. He later dropped the piano version of the song and revealed why he released the piano rendition of the song, explaining "I knew my fans love the original version, but I saw a lot of comments saying that they couldn't really hear my voice, so I wanted to reassure them that I can sing the song. I thought it'd be cool to not only have the original version but also the piano version and change it up." On May 29, 2013, he released his debut EP, Extended Play, in Japan only.

In June 2013, Mahone released a song called "What About Love". The music video won MTV's Artists to Watch at MTV Video Music Awards, and he was chosen as one of the opening acts of Taylor Swift's Red Tour.

In July 2013, Mahone featured in "Magik 2.0", a song by Becky G for The Smurfs 2 soundtrack. It was a rendition of B.o.B's "Magic". In December 2013, Mahone was named a "Digital and Brand Strategist" for Aquafina's FlavorSplash, a new line of flavored sparkling water targeted towards teens. On October 17, 2013, he kicked off his first ever headlining tour, MTV's Artist to Watch Tour. On November 13, Mahone released a song "Banga Banga" as a promotional single. "Mmm Yeah" was released as the lead single from The Secret, his second EP, on January 27, 2014. The Secret was later released on May 27, 2014. On July 25, 2014, Mahone kicked off his second headlining tour, Austin Mahone: Live on Tour.

2015–2018: This Is Not the Album and Dirty Work
During 2015, he continued to independently release music. Five new songs titled "Say My Name", "Places", "Waiting For This Love", "Someone Like You" and "Torture" were released for free download through his official SoundCloud page. Mahone starred in Becky G's music video for her song "Lovin' So Hard", whom he dated that time for five months. The video was released on May 6, 2015. On July 1, 2015, Mahone released "Dirty Work", the lead single from his upcoming debut album. In an interview with Billboard, he stated that the album would be released by the end of 2015. On September 5, 2015, it was announced that he will be joining T.I. and Pia Mia in support of Jason Derulo on his Australian tour for three dates beginning on November 20.

In August 2015, he was picked as Elvis Duran's Artist of the Month and was featured on NBC's Today show broadcast nationally in the United States where he performed live his single "Dirty Work" after an interview with Hoda Kotb and temporary host Jenna Bush Hager. Over the course of September and October 2015, Mahone continued to independently release new music, with the tracks "Do It Right", "On Your Way", "Not Far" and "Put It On Me" being released for free download on his Soundcloud page. In an interview with Teen Vogue on November 13, 2015, Mahone announced that he would be releasing a free mixtape before the end of the year. On December 15, 2015, Mahone revealed the title of the mixtape, This Is Not the Album. He also revealed the cover art and announced that it would be released on December 17, 2015. In May 2016, Mahone became one of the faces of Macy's American Icons campaign. He released two singles in August 2016: "Send It" featuring Rich Homie Quan and "Way Up". On December 7, 2016, via Facebook Live, Mahone announced his second mixtape, titled ForMe+You, which was released on December 29, 2016.

"Lady" served as the lead single, a remix of the 2001 "Lady (Hear Me Tonight)" by Modjo, featuring Pitbull. The song was released as a preview on December 22, 2016, and released officially on April 19, 2017.
On New Year's Eve, Mahone performed "Lady" on Pitbull's New Year's Revolution. He has since then performed at two Dolce & Gabbana fashion shows in Italy with his new work. He performed two shows while on the Pitbull After Dark Cruise. At the end of March 2017 he performed at POPSPRING Japan with his Hot 100 song "Dirty Work" which peaked at #1. He has now begun a campaign working with Fossil.
Mahone will be kicking off his A Tour For Me+You on Wednesday, May 31, starting in Ft. Lauderdale, Florida, going through Thursday, June 30, ending in Los Angeles, California. On Friday, April 12, Mahone released a new song, "Creatures of the Night", with DJ and record producer Hardwell.

Since 2017, Japanese comedian Blouson Chiemi started to use "Dirty Work" as the background music of her popular comedy routine, which led the song to peak number 4 on the Japan Hot 100 Chart, also ending up being certified gold in the country. Later, Mahone announced the release of his debut studio album exclusively in the country. It also included his collaborations "Lady" with Pitbull and "Creatures of the Night" with Hardwell which reached the number 1 position on Billboards US Dance Club Songs chart.

The album was released on October 18, 2017, accompanied with the released of "Perfect Body", exclusively in Japan. The song was featured in a commercial for the Japanese shampoo "Moist, Diane". The album's release day, Mahone put out on digital platforms and streaming services two countdown songs internationally: "I Don't Believe You" and "Found You".

On May 16, 2018, Mahone released the extended play, Oxygen exclusively in Japan.

2019–present: Upcoming album 
On February 4, 2019, Mahone released the single "Why Don't We", which is penned by Charlie Puth and categorized as a fusion of modern pop and old school R&B under the 90s' influences. The music video was released on March 2, 2019, on YouTube.

In October 2020, Mahone announced he was joining OnlyFans, an increasingly popular subscription-based website that allows content creators to make money from their more exclusive, premium content that they would not want to share on other free social media sites. He also released a new single called "Summer Love", on October 16, 2020, and which he previewed through OnlyFans. In November 2020, Mahone released "Miami", a collaboration with Mario Bautista & Lalo Ebratt. The single peaked at number 31 in Mexico. 

In January 2023, Mahone collaborated with Fueled by 808, Kid Rock and Jimmie Allen on the single "No Limits". In February 2023, Mahone released the single "Withdrawal", which was produced by Jim Jonsin.

Personal life
Mahone briefly dated Cuban-American singer Camila Cabello in 2014. He dated model Katya Elise Henry for less than a year. The two split in February 2017.

Discography

Studio album
 Dirty Work – The Album (2017)

Filmography

Concert tours
Headlining
 MTV Artist to Watch Tour (2013–14)
 Live on Tour (2014)
 A Tour For Me + You (2017)
 Oxygen Tour (2018)
 Japan Tour (2019)

Opening act
 Taylor Swift – The Red Tour (2013)
 Bridgit Mendler – Summer Tour (2013)
 Jason Derulo – Jason Derulo Tour (2015)

See also 
List of awards and nominations received by Austin Mahone

References

External links

1996 births
Living people
Musicians from San Antonio
People from San Antonio
American people of English descent
American people of French descent
American people of German descent
American people of Slovak descent
American male pop singers
Catholics from Texas
Cash Money Records artists
Child pop musicians
Internet memes
American child singers
Republic Records artists
Singers from Texas
Young Money Entertainment artists
21st-century American singers
21st-century American male singers
MTV Europe Music Award winners
Music YouTubers
Dance-pop musicians
YouTubers from Texas
OnlyFans creators